Dozzell is a surname. Notable people with the surname include:

Andre Dozzell (born 1999), English footballer
Jason Dozzell (born 1967), English footballer